Crain may refer to:

People
 Crain (surname)

Places
 Crain, Yonne, a commune in the region Bourgogne, France

Other
 Crain (band), an indie rock band
 Crain Communications, an American publishing conglomerate
 Crain crain, the common name of the leafy vegetable Corchorus in Sierra Leone.

See also
 Crane (disambiguation)